Cobbs Creek is a neighborhood located in the West Philadelphia section of Philadelphia, Pennsylvania, United States, named for the creek which forms part of Philadelphia's western border. Cobbs Creek is generally bounded by Market Street to the north, Baltimore Avenue to the south, 52nd Street to the east, and the border of Upper Darby along Cobbs Creek to the West.

In 1998, the Cobbs Creek Automobile Suburb Historic District was created, with Cobbs Creek Parkway, Spruce Street, 52nd Street, and Angora Street its boundaries. The District protects 1049 buildings, with Tudor Revival, Colonial Revival, and Bungalow/Craftsman architectural styles contained within the district.

Philadelphia architect William Alesker, who was involved in the plans for a Trump Tower in Center City, and Evangelical minister Tony Campolo, one of Bill Clinton's spiritual advisers, lived, respectively, in the 6200 blocks of Pine and Delancey Streets back in the 1940s and 1950s.

Fires from the 1985 bombing of the MOVE headquarters at 6221 Osage Avenue spread to 64 other buildings in the neighborhood. The destroyed homes were hastily rebuilt by the city, but were later condemned after years of attempted repairs to the shoddy construction.

Also listed on the National Register of Historic Places are the Holmes Junior High School and Walnut Park Plaza Hotel.

Education

Primary and secondary schools
The School District of Philadelphia operates public schools.  Andrew Hamilton Elementary School located at S.56th St. & Spruce St., Sayre High School (formerly a middle school) is located at S.58th St & Walnut St. and West Philadelphia High School.

In 2011 the Roman Catholic Archdiocese of Philadelphia announced the closures of St. Cyprian Catholic School, as its student numbers had declined.

Public libraries

Free Library of Philadelphia operates the Blanche A. Nixon/Cobbs Creek Branch at 5800 Cobbs Creek Parkway at the intersection of 59th Street and Baltimore Avenue. The branch opened in 1925 and was renamed in 1990 after an area activist.

References

External links
 
 Cobbs Creek Community Environmental Education Center
 InfoResources West Philadelphia Neighborhood - Cobbs Creek
 Historic Photographs of Cobbs Creek, PhillyHistory.org

Neighborhoods in Philadelphia
National Register of Historic Places in Philadelphia
Houses on the National Register of Historic Places in Pennsylvania
Colonial Revival architecture in Pennsylvania
Historic districts in Philadelphia
West Philadelphia
Houses in Philadelphia
Historic districts on the National Register of Historic Places in Pennsylvania